During the 1991–92 English football season, Plymouth Argyle F.C. competed in the Football League Second Division.

Season summary
In the 1991–92 season, businessman Dan McCauley became Plymouth's new chairman, and his first major decision was to sack David Kemp and appoint England's record cap holder Peter Shilton as player-manager. Shilton though was unable to prevent relegation as Argyle finished 22nd in Division Two.

Final league table

Results
Plymouth Argyle's score comes first

Legend

Football League Second Division

FA Cup

League Cup

Full Members Cup

Squad

References

Plymouth Argyle F.C. seasons
Plymouth Argyle